Nanak Naam Jahaz Hai is a 1969 National Award winning Punjabi film directed by Ram Maheshwary, starring Prithviraj Kapoor, I. S. Johar, Nishi and Vimi. The film is based on a true incident which took place at Golden Temple, Amritsar. The film was awarded the 1970 National Film Award for Best Feature Film in Punjabi, and National Film Award for Best Music Direction,

Plot
The film is set Amritsar in 1947, a devout Sikh and prosperous contracting businessman, Gurmukh Singh (Prithviraj Kapoor), lives with his wife, and younger brother, Prem. Trouble starts when Prem marries Ratan Kaur, as her brother, Sukha, creates differences between two brothers, which eventually lead to the closure of the business. However amidst all the difficult times that come Gurmukh never loses faith and in time, because of his sacrifice and quiet suffering, harmony is established in the family.

Cast

Soundtrack

S. Mohinder composed the music an Verma Malik penned the lyrics while many of the lyrical compositions are taken from the Gurbani (from the Sikh religious text, Guru Granth Sahib).
Shabad  "Re mann Aiso Karr" and also earned him a 1970 National Film Award for Best Music Direction

Bul Tere Ne Chandigarh De-Asha Bhosle, Mohammad Rafi,Lyrics by Verma Malik

Guran Ik Deh Bujhai-Manna Dey

Prabh Jo Tokhe Laaj Hamari-Asha Bhosle, Mahendra Kapoor

Kal Taran Guru Nanak Aaya-Bhai Samund Singh Raagi

Deh Shiva Bar Mohe-Mahendra Kapoor

Bissar Gayi Sab Tat Parayi-Manna Dey

Mittar Pyare Nu Haal-Mohammad Rafi

Hum Maile Tum Ujjal Karte-Manna Dey

Mere Sahiba Mere Sahib-Asha Bhosle

Re Man Aiso Kar Sanyasa-Asha Bhosle

Mitti Dundh Jag Chanan Hoya-Bhai Samund Singh Raagi

Lavan (Har Chouthari Lanv)-S. Mohinder and Bhushan Mehta

Haada Ni Haada Haner Pai Gaya-Shamshad Begum
Lyrics by Verma Malik

.

Restoration and re-release
While the original film was released on 15 April 1969, on the 500th birth anniversary (Guru Nanak Gurpurab) of Sikh Guru Guru Nanak, a digitally-enhanced version is set for release on 27 November 2015, presented by Shemaroo Entertainment and Wave Cinemas. The film is also dubbed in several regional languages, and the first teaser will be unveiled in Mumbai on 17 November at Kapoor family function. Earlier in the months, the film's trailer was launched at the historic Gurdwara Rakab Ganj Sahib in Delhi.

References

External links

 

1969 films
Punjabi-language Indian films
Indian drama films
Films set in Amritsar
Indian films based on actual events
Films set in 1947
Films about Sikhism
Best Punjabi Feature Film National Film Award winners